Polygamy in the Church of Jesus Christ of Latter Day Saints, or plural marriage, is generally believed to have originated with the founder of Mormonism, Joseph Smith. According to several of his associates, Smith taught that polygamy was a divine commandment and practiced it personally, by some accounts marrying more than 30 women, some of whom had existing marriages to other men. Evidence for Smith's polygamy is provided by the church's "sealing" records, affidavits, letters, journals, and diaries. However, until his death, Smith and the leading church quorums denied that he preached or practiced polygamy. Smith's son Joseph Smith III, his widow Emma Smith, and the Reorganized Church of Jesus Christ of Latter Day Saints (RLDS Church, now called Community of Christ) challenged the evidence and taught that Joseph Smith had opposed polygamy. They instead claimed that Brigham Young, the head of the Church of Jesus Christ of Latter-day Saints (LDS Church), introduced plural marriage after Smith's death. In 1852, leaders of the Utah-based LDS Church publicly announced the doctrine of polygamy.

1830s: origins 
When polygamy was introduced into the Latter Day Saint movement is uncertain.

Possible revelation in 1831

Some scholars believe that Smith transcribed a revelation recommending polygamy on July 17, 1831. This revelation is described in a letter to Brigham Young written in 1861 by an early Mormon convert, William W. Phelps, thirty years after the revelation was said to be given. This was during a period when LDS Church leaders were justifying the practice and origins of plural marriage, particularly to Mormon splinter groups who did not agree with the practice.

The key portion of the revelation proclaims: 

This wording is comparable with the portion of the 1830 edition of the Book of Mormon, which corresponds to today's 2 Nephi 30:5–6, which states that when Native Americans receive the gospel they will become a "white and a delightsome people." Unlike the 1831 revelation, the 1830 version of the Book of Mormon does not specify that the Native Americans would become "white and delightsome" through plural marriage. A note from Phelps in the same document explains how the conversion of the Native Americans coincided with Smith's plan for a new system of marriage: 

A reference was made to this revelation five months after its alleged date in a letter by Mormon apostate Ezra Booth to the Ohio Star on December 8, 1831, in which he refers to the "revelation [that the Mormon Elders] form a matrimonial alliance with the Natives", but the letter makes no reference to polygamy. This letter is significant in that it confirms that a revelation about marrying Natives occurred, but it is also problematic for multiple reasons. One is the context for the revelation. Mormon missionaries had been denied access to the Indian Territory as they lacked authorization from the US Indian Agents. They sought access multiple times and were never granted permission. To circumvent this, they were to get a license from the government to trade goods with the Indians and while trading "disseminate the principles of Mormonism among them." In addition to the trading license, marrying the Natives would be an additional means of circumventing the US Indian Agents. Finally, had the revelation mentioned polygamy, Booth would likely have mentioned it as it would further his anti-Mormon agenda. 

The LDS Church never published Phelps's note or letter, nor has it been canonized as part of Mormon scripture, which was done with many of Smith's other revelations. In 1943, historian Fawn Brodie stated that LDS Church historian Joseph Fielding Smith told her that a revelation foreshadowing polygamy had been written in 1831 but never published, and that although its existence in the church library is acknowledged, "in conformity with the church policy", Brodie would not be permitted to examine it. Three authors assert that a second record of the revelation exists, believed to be in the LDS Church's historical department, though its existence has not been confirmed by the church.

Though the 1831 revelation is cited by Mormon historians, non-Mormon historians, and critics, there are dissenting opinions, and no consensus has been reached.

Early teachings and practice

After Smith's death, many early converts, including apostles Brigham Young, Orson Pratt, and Lyman E. Johnson, said that Smith was teaching plural marriage as early as 1831 or 1832. Mary Elizabeth Rollins Lightner, Smith's ninth wife claimed that Smith had a private conversation with her in 1831 when she was twelve. 

Pratt reported that Smith told some early members in 1831 and 1832 that plural marriage was a true principle, but that the time to practice it had not yet come. Johnson also claimed to have heard the doctrine from Smith in 1831. Mosiah Hancock reported that his father Levi W. Hancock was taught about plural marriage in the spring of 1832.

William Clayton, Smith's scribe, recorded polygamous marriages in 1843, including unions between Smith and Eliza Partridge, Emily Partridge, Sarah Ann Whitney, Helen Kimball, and Flora Woodworth.

Jacob Cochran
Latter Day Saint historical sources indicate that as early as 1832, Mormon missionaries were converting followers of religious leader Jacob Cochran, who went into hiding in 1830 to escape imprisonment for practicing polygamy. Mormons held two conferences at Saco, Maine, the center of Cochranism, on June 13, 1834, and August 21, 1835. At the latter conference, at least seven of the twelve newly ordained Mormon apostles were in attendance, including Brigham Young. Young became acquainted with Cochran's followers as he made several missionary journeys through Cochranite territory from Boston to Saco, and later married Augusta Adams Cobb, a former Cochranite, as one of his plural wives. Others who spent time among the Cochranites were Orson Hyde and Smith's younger brother, Samuel.

Among Cochran's marital innovations was "spiritual wifery". Ridlon wrote in 1895, "tradition assumes that [Cochran] received frequent consignments of spiritual consorts, and that such were invariably the most robust and attractive women in the community." Some new Cochranites remained polygamists, and moved from the east coast to the Mormon community of Kirtland, Ohio. Rumors of Mormon polygamy began to become public, enough to be denied in Mormon publications and mentioned in Mormon scripture in 1835, which noted:

1840s: development and fallout

1843 revelation

On July 12, 1843, Joseph Smith is said to have received a revelation that is much more widely accepted by historians. The revelation was supposedly dictated by Smith to his scribe William Clayton, and was shared with Smith's wife Emma later that day. Clayton wrote in his journal: 

In the text of the revelation, it also states that the first wife's consent should be sought before a man marries another wife, but also declares that Christ will "destroy" the first wife if she does not consent to the plural marriage, and that if consent is denied the husband is exempt from asking his wife's consent in the future.

The revelation states that plural wives "are given unto him to multiply and replenish the earth, according to my commandment, and to fulfill the promise which was given by my Father before the foundation of the world, and for their exaltation in the eternal worlds, that they may bear the souls of men."

The revelation was not made public to the LDS Church as a whole until Brigham Young publicly acknowledged it in 1852. Young claimed that the original had been burned by Smith's widow Emma Smith, though Emma denied that the document ever existed and said of the story told by Young: "It is false in all its parts, made out of whole cloth, without any foundation in truth." Published affidavits by eyewitnesses accusing church leaders of following the teaching and engaging in polygamy had resulted in Smith's murder by a mob in 1844. The revelation was codified in the LDS Church's canon as its Doctrine and Covenants section 132 in the 1870s. The 1843 revelation was rejected by the RLDS Church as not originating with Smith. Emma Smith said that the first she knew of the 1843 revelation was when she read of it in Orson Pratt's newspaper The Seer in 1853.

Before Smith's death 
Records show that Smith publicly preached and wrote against the doctrine of plural marriage; however, it is also clear that Smith performed dozens of plural marriages. Allegedly, "several were still pubescent girls, such as fourteen-year-old Helen Mar Kimball". Kimball, Smith's 28th wife, wrote of her experience in 1843–44, 

Written accounts of Smith's alleged liaisons are recorded as early as 1831, including Smith's relationship with Fanny Alger (age 16), and with Marinda Nancy Johnson (age 16) in 1831.

Smith's marriages  

Poor documentation has led to estimates of the number of Smith's plural wives ranging from 33 to 48. Among the more notable alleged wives are the teenage servant Fanny Alger and future Relief Society president Eliza R. Snow. Historians generally conclude that Smith did have multiple wives, but as Compton has written, little is known of these marriages after the sealing ceremony. Allegations that Smith had at least one child born to a plural wife remain unproven. Helen Mar Kimball's testimony and some scholars suggest that many of these marriages were not consummated. Statements by William Law, Eliza R. Snow and Mary Lightner indicate that at least some of the marriages included sexual intimacy.

The general use of the terms "sealing" (which is a LDS priesthood ordinance that binds individuals together in the eternities) to refer to the unions rather than "marriage" (a social tradition in which the man and woman agree to be husband and wife in this life) may indicate that the participants did not understand sealing to equate to marriage. In the early days of the Latter Day Saint movement, ordinances and doctrines were not always well-defined, and it is possible that different participants had different understandings of the meaning of the sealings.

After Smith's death 

Scholars acknowledge that the tallies of Smith's plural wives include proxy sealings that occurred after Smith's death. Latter Day Saint denominations disagree as to the impact and meaning of these ceremonies. In the latter part of his life, Smith taught that all humans must be united or sealed to each other. He taught that a marriage that extends after death is also called "sealing", and that the power to perform such ceremonies was initially held only by him; members of the LDS Church believe that Smith passed the authority to the members of the Quorum of the Twelve.

Smith's alleged children 

The question of children from Smith's alleged plural wives has been raised since his death. Smith has not been proven to have had children other than those born to Emma Smith. , there are at least twelve early individuals who, based on historical documents and circumstantial evidence, have been identified as children of women sealed to Smith at the time of their births.

In 2005 and 2007 studies, a geneticist with the Sorenson Molecular Genealogy Foundation showed that five of these individuals were in fact not Smith descendants: Mosiah Hancock (son of Clarissa Reed Hancock); Oliver Buell (son of Prescindia Huntington Buell); Moroni Llewellyn Pratt (son of Mary Ann Frost Pratt); Zebulon Jacobs (son of Zina Diantha Huntington Jacobs Smith); and Orrison Smith (son of Fanny Alger). The remaining seven have yet to be tested, including Josephine Lyon, for whom current DNA testing cannot provide conclusive evidence either way. Lyon's mother, Sylvia Sessions Lyon, left her daughter a deathbed affidavit telling her she was Smith's daughter. Research into this history is complicated by Y-DNA genetic testing only being possible for descendants with an unbroken male line, and because two candidates died as infants.

Smith was accused by Sarah Pratt in an 1886 interview with "vitriolic anti-Mormon journalist W. Wyl" of allowing John C. Bennett, a medical doctor, to perform abortions on polygamous wives who were legally single, which Pratt alleged limited Smith's progeny from these wives. She based this on statements made to her by Bennett. This is corroborated by an August 1, 1842 affidavit published by Hyrum Smith in the Church periodical Times and Seasons, where Hyrum claimed that Bennett had been telling women that "he would give them medicine to produce abortions, providing they should become pregnant."   Orson Pratt, Sarah Pratt's husband, later considered Bennett a liar, but Sarah Pratt said, "[I] know that the principal statements in John C. Bennett's book on Mormonism are true."

1842 scandal and the new vocabulary 
Joseph Smith broke with short-lived church leader John C. Bennett in 1841 over the public scandal that arose when Bennett's practice of "spiritual wifery" became known, and Nauvoo, Illinois "rocked with tales that connected Joseph with Bennett's scandals." Bennett accused Smith of subsequently introducing new code words for polygamy—"celestial marriage", "plurality of wives", "spiritual wifeism"—to conceal the controversial practice. Sarah Pratt claimed in an 1886 interview that while in Nauvoo over forty years earlier, Smith was attracted to her and intended to make her "one of his spiritual wives." According to Bennett, while Pratt's husband Orson was in England on missionary service, Smith proposed to Sarah by invoking the 1843 polygamy revelation: "Sister Pratt, the Lord has given you to me as one of my spiritual wives. I have the blessings of Jacob granted me, as he granted holy men of old, and I have long looked upon you with favor, and hope you will not repulse or deny me", to which Bennett claimed Pratt replied: "Am I called upon to break the marriage covenant ... to my lawful husband! I never will. I care not for the blessings of Jacob, and I believe in NO SUCH revelations, neither will I consent under any circumstances. I have one good husband, and that is enough for me."

Published allegations of adultery against Sarah Pratt and Bennett appeared in local and church publications with signed affidavits from her neighbors Stephen and Zeruiah Goddard and others. Robert D. Foster made the following allegation against Bennett and Pratt: 

Pratt later claimed that Zeruiah Goddard told her these testimonies were made under threat from Smith's brother Hyrum: 

Van Wagoner has concluded that the adultery charges against Sarah Pratt are "highly improbable" and could "be dismissed as slander." In addition to Pratt, Van Wagoner states that Nancy Rigdon and Martha Brotherton "also suffered slanderous attacks because they exposed the Church's private polygamy posture." Orson Pratt stood by his wife in preference to the denials of Smith, who had told him "[i]f [Orson] did believe his wife and follow her suggestions he would go to hell". Wilford Woodruff stated that "Dr. John Cook Bennett was the ruin of Orson Pratt". Van Wagoner and Walker note that, on August 20, 1842, "after four days of fruitless efforts at reconciliation, the Twelve excommunicated Pratt for 'insubordination' and Sarah for 'adultery. However, after a brief period of estrangement from Smith and the church in 1842, Orson Pratt labeled Bennett a liar: 

First Presidency member Sidney Rigdon wrote a letter to the Messenger and Advocate in 1844 condemning the conduct of the Quorum of the Twelve, 

According to Van Wagoner,

The Nauvoo Expositor 

Rumours of Smith's involvement with polygamy continued to circulate in Nauvoo, to which Smith responded on May 26, 1844: 

A group of former church members were in open conflict with Smith for various economic and political reasons, and because Smith had disciplined some of them in church courts for adultery, thievery, and other crimes. William Law, a member of the First Presidency, became the head of this group. Accusations of polygamy among church leaders were published by the group in the Nauvoo Expositor on June 7, 1844, in which several signed and notarized affidavits from eyewitnesses were reproduced. The affidavit by Law stated, "Hyrum Smith [read] a revelation from God, he said that he was with Joseph when it was received. ... The revelation (so called) authorized certain men to have more wives than one at a time." The affidavit by Austin Cowles stated, "In the latter part of the summer, 1843, the Patriarch, Hyrum Smith, did in the High Council, of which I was a member, introduce what he said was a revelation given through the Prophet [containing] the doctrine of a plurality of wives."

Both Joseph and his brother Hyrum, days before their murder by a mob, spoke about the accusations at a Nauvoo city council meeting of June 8, 1844. The meeting's purpose was ostensibly to address the Nauvoo Expositors accusations of Mormon licentiousness, though after two days of consultation, Smith and the Nauvoo city council voted on June 10, 1844 to declare the paper a public nuisance and ordered the paper's printing press destroyed. The published minutes quote Hyrum making references "to the Revelation read to the High Council of the Church, which has caused so much talk about multiplicity of wives; that said Revelation was in answer to a question concerning things which transpired in former days, and had no reference to the present time [original emphasis]. Following Hyrum, Joseph Smith said "they make a criminality for a man to have a wife on earth while he has one in heaven" and that "the Revelation was given in view of eternity": 'He received for answer, men in this life must marry in view of eternity, otherwise they must remain as angels, or be single in heaven, which was the amount of the Revelation referred to[.].

In H. Michael Marquardt's opinion, "this was an attempt by Smith to obscure the real intent of the revelatory message," and W. E. La Rue emphasizes the contradiction between the statements of the two brothers. J. L. Clark writes that Hyrum's statement "appeared in the Nauvoo Neighbor of June 19, 1844, but was omitted from [B. H. Roberts's book] History of the Church, published years later in Utah."

Joseph and Hyrum Smith were subsequently jailed and charged with treason against the state of Illinois for declaring martial law in Nauvoo. On June 27, 1844, in spite of a promise of protection from Illinois governor Thomas Ford, a mob attacked the prison and killed both brothers, an event that prompted a succession crisis that led to schisms in the Latter Day Saint movement that continue to this day. The majority of the Latter Day Saints followed Brigham Young when he led the Mormon Exodus to the Salt Lake Valley in 1846–47. Some Latter Day Saints remained in Illinois and the surrounding states and selected different leaders.

1850s: official sanction 
In Utah Territory, Young led the LDS Church. The doctrine of plural wives was officially announced by Orson Pratt and Young at a special conference at the Salt Lake Tabernacle on August 28, 1852, and reprinted in an extra edition of the Deseret News, where Pratt stated: 

Young expounded on Pratt's words later that day. Young's proclamation began: 

Additionally, the apostle Parley P. Pratt taught in an official church periodical in 1853 that, "We have now clearly shown that God the Father had a plurality of wives," and that after the death of Mary (the mother of Jesus) she may have become another eternal polygamous wife of God.

Teachings on the multiple wives of God and Jesus

Following the 1852 official sanction, top leaders used the examples of the polygamy of God the Father and Jesus Christ in defense of it, and these teachings on God and Jesus' polygamy were widely accepted among Mormons by the late 1850s. In 1853 Jedediah Grant who later become a First Presidency member stated that the top reason behind the persecution of Christ and his disciples was due to their practice of polygamy. Two months later the apostle Orson Pratt taught in an official church periodical that "We have now clearly shown that God the Father had a plurality of wives," and that after her death, Mary (the mother of Jesus) may have become another eternal polygamous wife of God. He also stated that Christ had multiple wives as further evidence in defense of polygamy. In the next two years the apostle Orson Hyde also stated during two general conference addresses that Jesus practiced polygamy and repeated this in an 1857 address. This teaching was alluded to by church president Brigham Young in 1870 and then First Presidency member Joseph F. Smith in 1883.

Expansion and repudiation

Under Young, the practice of polygamy spread among Utah Mormons for 40 years. During this time, an estimated 20 to 25 percent of adults in the LDS Church were members of polygamist households. One third of the women of marriageable age and nearly all of the church leadership were involved in the practice. In 1890, the church repealed the practice of polygamy while under pressure by the United States government. The repeal was directed by revelation to church president Wilford Woodruff and published as the 1890 Manifesto. Polygamy was definitively ended in the LDS Church with the Second Manifesto in 1905.

Stance of other Latter Day Saint sects 
Though the LDS Church accepts that Joseph Smith taught and practiced plural marriage, other branches of the Latter Day Saint movement reject this position. Traditionally, the strongest rejection came from the RLDS Church. In the late-nineteenth century, the origin of polygamy was one of the principal issues that the RLDS Church and the LDS Church used to assert one organization's legitimacy over the other. Joseph F. Smith, sixth president of the LDS Church, stated in responding to the claim that polygamy originated with Brigham Young rather than Joseph Smith:

RLDS Church under Joseph Smith III 
The first RLDS Church's leader was Joseph Smith's oldest son Joseph Smith III. Smith III's opinions about his father and polygamy evolved throughout his life. In general, however, Smith III was an ardent opponent of plural marriage. Throughout his tenure as Prophet-President of the RLDS Church, Smith denied his father's involvement and attributed its invention to Brigham Young. Smith III served many missions to the western United States where he met with associates and women who claimed to be his father's widows. In the end, Smith concluded that he was "not positive nor sure that [his father] was innocent" and that if, indeed, the elder Smith had been involved, it was still a false practice.

Historical RLDS Church position 
From the 1880s to the 1960s, official RLDS Church publications maintained Joseph Smith's noninvolvement in polygamy. This official position contradicted the testimony of earlier RLDS Church members who lived in Nauvoo during Smith's lifetime.

One of the founders of the Reorganization, Jason W. Briggs, a presiding elder in Wisconsin during the early 1840s, maintained throughout his life that Smith had originated polygamy and that God would punish Smith for his "transgressions." Briggs said that the church needed to simply deal with the issue and move on. The editor of the earliest official RLDS Church periodical, Isaac Sheen, similarly affirmed Smith's involvement. He wrote that Smith produced a revelation on polygamy and practiced it, but that he repented of this "sin" before his death. Sheen's statement was affirmed by William Marks, the stake president of Nauvoo during Smith's lifetime and a close counselor to Joseph Smith III. Marks claimed to have seen Hyrum Smith read the polygamy revelation to the High Council in 1843. Marks also affirmed that Joseph Smith had repented of the practice two to three weeks before his death in 1844. Similarly, James Whitehead, an RLDS Church member and clerk for Smith, affirmed that Emma Smith gave plural wives to Smith on several occasions that he witnessed. Early in his presidency, Joseph Smith III did not believe Marks and Whitehead despite the eyewitness nature of their statements.

Community of Christ position 
Community of Christ, formerly the RLDS Church, no longer makes definitive statements that Smith was uninvolved in polygamy. The church's current approach is to stress its historical abhorrence of polygamy, that members of the church and the leadership are open to continue their "ongoing quest for truth", and that the "Community of Christ takes into account the growing body of scholarly research and publications depicting the polygamous teachings and practices of the Nauvoo period of church history (1840–1846)". Further, 

A segment of church members continue to deny Smith's complicity, although the church no longer views the issue as important. For people concerned about the topic and how it relates to the RLDS tradition, the issue remains as much about current liberal versus conservative church politics as it does an issue of history.

Modern RLDS Restorationist position 
Modern RLDS Restorationists (such as the Restoration Branches), who have broken with Community of Christ, continue to contend that polygamy originated with Brigham Young and not with Joseph Smith. They note that the revelation endorsing polygamy and attributed to Smith was first presented by Young to his followers eight years after Smith's death; they point to this delay as suggestive that the revelation did not originate with Smith. As further evidence, they often cite Smith's own critical words on the subject of polygamy. They do not see the isolated statements to the contrary by early RLDS Church leaders such as Sheen, Marks, or Briggs as credible, and they deny the legitimacy and truthfulness of sources that are commonly cited to prove that Smith was practicing or promoting plural marriage.

See also

 Criticism of the Latter Day Saint movement
 Islam and Mormonism

Notes

References

.
.
.
.
.
.
.
.

.
.
.
. Discusses the twentieth-century RLDS struggle to remember polygamy in the context of general American religious controversies in the same era.
.
.
.
. Provides a discussion of Joseph Smith III's attempts to understand polygamy's origins and his father's role or lack thereof.
.
.
.
.
.
.
.
.
.
.
.
.
.
.
.
.
.
.
.
.
.
.

Further reading 

  – provides a historical overview
  – specifically about the beginnings of plural marriage

 
.
.
.
.

Polygamy
19th-century Mormonism
Joseph Smith
Brigham Young
Polygamy
Doctrine and Covenants